The Moe Football Netball Club, nicknamed the Lions, is an Australian rules football and netball club based at Ted Summerton Reserve in the town of Moe, Victoria. The club teams currently compete in the Gippsland Football League.

Club history
There was a meeting at Semmen's Moe Hotel in April, 1889 to form a local football club, with Mr. A A McPhee elected as President, R J Martin - Secretary and C W J Coleman as Treasurer.  Mr. C W J Coleman was elected as club captain as Mr. J Watson was appointed as vice captain for 1889.

Moe played in the Miller Cup in 1889 and the Kennedy Cup competition in 1890.

Moe Football Club was re-established in 1900, at a meeting Leith's Club Hotel, with Captain Leith elected as President. Captain Leith was President in 1901 too  and played in the West Gippsland Football Association in 1901.  

In 1908, Moe wore the colours of red, white and blue.

Moe FC entered the Central Gippsland FA in 1909, which was the major league in Gippsland at the time. 

In 1910, Moe wore the colours of "blue knickers, blue guernsey with sash and red stockings" 

At the club's 1911 AGM Mr. H Smith's offer to coach the football club was accepted with Cr. W Beck - President, A Simmons - Secretary and B Gibson - Treasurer.

Mr. P McCarthy, Moe footballer collided with a Warragul player on Wednesday, 7 June 1911 and was taken to the Warragul Hospital. McCarthy required surgery on the Friday, and later died on Sunday morning.

Moe won the Narracan Shire Football Association premiership in 1912.

At the club’s 1914 AGM, the club adopted the colors of maroon guernsey and stockings and white knickers. 

In 1927 the club decided to play in the Erica District Football Association. They were too strong for the other clubs and won the premiership. Moe were behind in the dying seconds of the grand final against Baw Baw when J Walsh marked and kicked the winning goal to win the flag for Moe by three points.

Back in the Central Gippsland FA from 1928, they remained in the league until it was replaced by the Latrobe Valley Football League in 1954.

Moe won the 1941 Yallourn & District Football Association premiership.

In 1944 and 1945 Moe played in the Central Gippsland Wartime Football League, won by Yallourn in 1944, then Moe won the 1945 premiership defeating Yallourn.

Club coach, Don Keyter polled the most votes (23) in the 1963 LVFL best and fairest - Trood Award / Rodda Medal count, but  was ineligible due to a suspension he incurred during the season. Ironically the award was won by Moe player, Alan Steel with 18 votes. 

The club had senior football Premiership success the Latrobe Valley FL in 1956 and 1967.

Football Competition Timeline
1889 - Miller Challenge Cup 
1890 - Kennedy Challenge Cup
1891 to 1897 - ?
1898 & 1899 - Hall’s Challenge Cup 
1901 to 1908? - West Gippsland Football Association
1909 to 1911 - Central Gippsland Football Association
1912 & 1913? - Narracan Shire Football Association
1914 & 1915? - Morwell District Football Association
1916 to 1918 - CGFA in recess due to WWI
1919 to 1926 - Central Gippsland Football Association
1927 - Erica & District Football Association
1928 to 1940 - Central Gippsland Football Association
1941 - Yallourn & District Football Association
1942 & 1943 - Club in recess due to WW2
1944 & 1945 - Central Gippsland Wartime Football Association
1946 to 1953 - Central Gippsland Football League
1954 to 2001 - Latrobe Valley Football League
2002 to 2009 - West Gippsland Latrobe Football League
2010 to 2021 - Gippsland Football League

Football Premierships
Seniors
Narracan Shire Football Association
1912 - Moe: 6.5 - 41 defeated Yarragon: 2.4 - 16
Erica District Football Association
1927 - Moe: 8.9 - 57 defeated Baw Baw: 8.6 - 54
Yallourn & District Football Association
1941 - Moe: 8.12 - 60 defeated Yallourn Powerhouse: 5.10 - 40 
Central Gippsland Wartime Football League
1945 - Moe: 6.12 - 48 defeated Yallourn: 4.10 - 34 
Latrobe Valley Football League
1956 - Moe: 10.9 - 69 defeated Traralgon: 8.13 - 61
1967 - Moe: defeated Bairnsdale: by six points

Reserves
LaTrobe Valley Football League
1959, 1967, 1968

Thirds / Under 18's
LaTrobe Valley Football League
1959, 1991

Fourths / Under 16's
Gippsland Football League
2014, 2016, 2017

Football League Best & Fairest Awards
Seniors
Central Gippsland Football Association: Rodda Medal
1936 - Ivan Williams 
1939 - A "Bert" Tabuteau   

Latrobe Valley Football League: Trood Award / Rodda Medal
1958 - Lester Ross
1963 - Alan Steel. Don Keyter, from Moe FC polled 23 votes, but was ineligible  
1973 - Barry Rowlings
1974 - Barry Rowlings
1988 - Lachlan Sim
2000 - Jason Shields 

Gippsland Football League
2017 - James Blazer

VFL/ AFL players
The following footballers played with Moe prior to making their VFL / AFL debut.
 1925 - Peter Reville - , 
 1933 - Charlie Richards - Footscray
 1935 - Ken Feltscheer - , 
 1949 - Laurie Shipp - North Melbourne
 1951 - Alby Law - 
 1959 - Lester Ross - St. Kilda
 1960 - John Somerville -  
 1962 - George Savige - Footscray
 1968 - Ted Hopkins - 
 1975 - Barry Rowlings - , 
 1988 - Peter Somerville- 
 1989 - Lachlan Sim - Brisbane Bears 
 2000 - Troy Makepeace - 
 2016 - Sam Skinner - Brisbane
 2018 - Declan Keilty - Melbourne

The following footballers played senior VFL / AFL football prior to playing with Moe. The year indicates their first season with Moe.
1955 - Jervis Stokes - Richmond
1963 - Kevin Northcote - Hawthorn
2019 - Bernie Vince - Adelaide, Melbourne

References

External links
 SportsTG site
 Teamapp site
 List of Gippsland FL Football Premierships
 Gippsland FL Best & Fairest Lists
 1934 - Moe FC & Trafalgar FC team photos
 1941 - Moe FC Officials photo
 1941 - Yallourn & District FA grand final. Moe & Yallourn team photos
 1953 - Moe Football Club team photo
 1956 - Moe FC & Yallourn FC team photos

Australian rules football clubs in Victoria (Australia)
Australian rules football clubs established in 1909
1909 establishments in Australia
Gippsland Football League
Netball teams in Victoria (Australia)
Sports clubs established in 1909